Belvedere is a village in Tuscany, central Italy, administratively a frazione of the comune of Suvereto, province of Livorno. At the time of the 2001 census its population was 12.

Belvedere is about 75 km from Livorno and 2 km from Suvereto.

References

Bibliography

External links 
 

Frazioni of Suvereto